Carl Soderberg may refer to:
Carl Söderberg, Swedish ice hockey player
Carl R. Soderberg (1895-1979), Institute Professor at the Massachusetts Institute of Technology